Szczawno  is a village in the administrative district of Gmina Dąbie, within Krosno Odrzańskie County, Lubusz Voivodeship, in western Poland.

References

Szczawno